Polyodontes is a genus of polychaete worms in the subclass Aciculata.

Species 
 Polyodontes atromarginatus Horst, 1917
 Polyodontes australiensis (McIntosh, 1885)
 Polyodontes frankenbergi Pettibone, 1989
 Polyodontes frons Hartman, 1939
 Polyodontes jolli Pettibone, 1989
 Polyodontes lupinus (Stimpson, 1856)
 Polyodontes maxillosus (Ranzani, 1817)
 Polyodontes oculea (Treadwell, 1901)
 Polyodontes oerstedi (Kinberg, 1855)
 Polyodontes panamensis (Chamberlin, 1919)
 Polyodontes renieri Grube, 1876
 Polyodontes sibogae Horst, 1917
 Polyodontes texanus Pettibone, 1989
 Polyodontes tidemani Pflugfelder, 1932
 Polyodontes vanderloosi Barnich & Steene, 2003

References 

 World Register of Marine Species

Polychaetes